Heuglin's white-eye (Zosterops poliogastrus), also known as the Ethiopian white-eye (formerly the montane white-eye), is a species of bird in the family Zosteropidae. It is found in north-eastern and eastern Africa, primarily in Ethiopia and Kenya. Its natural habitats range from subtropical or tropical moist montane forests, to subtropical or tropical high-altitude shrubland, plantations, and rural gardens.

The Mbulu white-eye, the south Pare white-eye and the broad-ringed white-eye were formerly considered as subspecies of Heuglin's white-eye. They were promoted to species rank based on a molecular phylogenetic study published in 2014. To reflect this change, the English name was changed from "montane white-eye" to "Heuglin's white-eye".

There are three subspecies:
 Z. p. kulalensis (Kulal) Williams, JG, 1948 – Mount Kulal (north Kenya)
 Z. p. poliogastrus (Ethiopian) Heuglin, 1861 – southeast Sudan, Eritrea, north, central, and east Ethiopia
 Z. p. kaffensis (Kaffa) Neumann, 1902 – west and southwest Ethiopia

Identification by subspecies

Heuglin's white-eye (Kulal) 
The Kulal Heuglin's white-eye adult male is about 11-12 centimeters long. The male sex has different characteristics than the female. The male has a bright yellow forehead, and a lime-green crown (top of a bird's head) and upper feathers. Its flight feather colors vary from brownish black to grey and edge off with a matching green tint to its crown. Its tail is like its flight feathers, brownish black to grey with green edges. The belly is a bright white that fades into the color of its surrounding feathers. Different from the male, the female may have a yellow belly and wings that are mostly grey.

Heuglin's white-eye (Ethiopian) 
The Ethiopian Heuglin's white-eye has a vivid yellow head and crown that extends all the way to its white eyering (a circle of color around a bird's eye) and a narrow black line extending from the eye to its black beak. Underneath the beak, the rest of the head is yellow as well. On the Ethiopian Heuglin's white-eye, the flight feathers have a lime-green coloration. The tips of the feathers then shift to a brownish black. Both sexes share the same attributes.

Heuglin's white-eye (Kaffa) 
The crown of the Kaffa Heuglin's white-eye is rich green with a yellow forehead leading to its black bill. Under the beak, yellow and green are the dominant colors of the chin. Its eyering is white and is slightly larger than the Ethiopian white-eye's. Depending on their diet, their flight feathers are brownish-black that fade into a yellow-green edge. The tail generally matches the flight feathers but tends to be a shiny, dark brown. The breast of the bird has green flanks (the sides of the bird's body) that fade into a yellow-tinged middle. Both sexes share the same attributes.

Habitat and distribution 
During the dry season, the Heuglin's white-eye are commonly found in large flocks of up to fifty birds. However, in the wet season, flocks of this size are only seen in the early mornings or late afternoons. The habitat of the Heuglin's white-eye varies by subspecies.

Heuglin's white-eye (Kulal) 
The Heuglin's white-eye (Kulal) habitat typically consists of forest edges and wet bush. However, during the wet season they can be found in drier bush at lower altitudes, and in the dry season they can be found in montane forests at higher altitudes.

Heuglin's white-eye (Ethiopian) 
The Heuglin's white-eye (Ethiopian) habitat generally consists of woodland and forest edges, as well as isolated cultivations. In these areas, they commonly live in younger growths or shorter trees. They live anywhere from 1340 to 3640 meters in Ethiopia and above 1800 meters in South Sudan.

Heuglin's white-eye (Kaffa) 
The Heuglin's white-eye (Kaffa) habitat generally consists of woodland and forest edges, as well as highlands with younger areas of secondary growth. They typically live within the 1340 to 3640 meter elevational band (a section of altitude above sea level).

Migration 
Both the Heuglin's white-eye (Ethiopian) and (Kaffa) are nonmigrants (sedentary), while the Heuglin's white-eye (Kulal) descends from higher to lower altitudes as the wet season approaches.

Diet 
The Heuglin's white-eye diet mainly consists of berries and small insects. However, in the months of September and November they can be found foraging on Leonotis flowers. During the dry season, this bird is mainly frugivorous, while insectivorous in the wet season.

References 

Heuglin's white-eye
Birds of East Africa
Heuglin's white-eye
Taxa named by Theodor von Heuglin
Taxonomy articles created by Polbot